Fredlin Mompremier (born 25 November 1996) is a Haitian footballer who plays as a forward for  club Safa.

Career
On 26 February 2020, he signed with USL Championship side Sporting Kansas City II. He was released by Sporting Kansas City on 30 November 2020. On 12 July 2021, he signed for Moldovan club FC Sfîntul Gheorghe.

References

External links
 

1996 births
Living people
Association football forwards
Haitian footballers
Haiti youth international footballers
Fairleigh Dickinson Knights men's soccer players
Ocean City Nor'easters players
Tampa Spartans men's soccer players
FC Tulsa players
Sporting Kansas City II players
FC Sfîntul Gheorghe players
Safa SC players
USL Championship players
USL League Two players
Moldovan Super Liga players
Lebanese Premier League players
Haitian expatriate footballers
Haitian expatriate sportspeople in the United States
Haitian expatriate sportspeople in Moldova
Haitian expatriate sportspeople in Lebanon
Expatriate soccer players in the United States
Expatriate footballers in Moldova
Expatriate footballers in Lebanon